

The Mil V-5 was a project in the late 1950s for a medium single-turboshaft transport helicopter, probably a variant for the Mil Mi-2. The engine was a 300 kW Klimov GTD-350 turboshaft engine. The project never reached production.

References

1950s Soviet civil utility aircraft
Mil aircraft
1950s Soviet helicopters
Abandoned military aircraft projects of the Soviet Union
Single-turbine helicopters